The Ukrainian Republican Party (Ukrajinska Respublikanska Partija) was the first registered political party in Ukraine created on November 5, 1990 by the Ministry of Justice of UkrSSR. URP was founded earlier that year in place of the Ukrainian Helsinki Group in April 1990. In April 2002 the party merged with the Ukrainian People's Party "Sobor" as the Ukrainian Republican Party "Sobor".

History
November 1976 — Ukrainian community groups was established to promote the implementation of the Helsinki agreements. Almost all members of this Ukrainian Helsinki Group where subsequently repressed, four of them (V. Stus, Yu. Lytvyn, O. Tykhyi, V. Marchenko) died in Soviet camps (Gulag).

March 1988 — Ukrainian Helsinki Union (UKhS) was formed. Since 1989, UKhS has moved to open propaganda activity of promoting the independence of Ukraine.

April 29–30, 1990 — Ukrainian Republican Party (URP) was established in the place of the UKhS. The party was registered on November 5, 1990 by the Ministry of Justice of the Ukrainian SSR as the first political party in Ukraine.

A 1992 split in the party resulted in the creation of the rival Ukrainian Conservative Republican Party (UKRP) led by Stepan Khmara.

In the 1994 parliamentary elections the URP core party obtained nine seats initially adding three more by the end of the year.

During the 1998 Ukrainian parliamentary election the party was part (together with Congress of Ukrainian Nationalists & Ukrainian Conservative Republican Party) of the Election Bloc "National Front" which won 2,71% of the national votes and 6 (single-mandate constituency) seats. In January 2001 the "National Front" parliamentary faction had grown to 17 deputies.

After being part of the National Salvation Committee the party became part of the Yulia Tymoshenko Electoral Bloc alliance during the Ukrainian 2002 parliamentary elections. On April 21, 2002 the party merged with the Ukrainian People's Party "Sobor" as the Ukrainian Republican Party "Sobor".

In May 2006 Levko Lukyanenko tried to reestablish URP after URP Sobor switched to Our Ukraine–People's Self-Defense Bloc from the Yulia Tymoshenko Bloc; the new party became known as the URP of Lukyanenko and registered in 2006.

References

1990 establishments in Ukraine
Political parties established in 1990
Pro-independence parties in the Soviet Union
National conservative parties